Rio Yañez (born in 1980) is an American curator and artist. He is currently based in the San Francisco Bay Area.

Biography 
Rio Yañez was born in 1980 at San Francisco General Hospital in San Francisco, California to artists Yolanda Lopez and René Yañez. His parents separated after a few years but they remained as neighbors in the same building in the Mission District in San Francisco. Yañez attended California Institute of the Arts and received a BFA degree in 2005. Rio and René Yañez collaborated on art for many years, starting in 2005. He has been active with his art at Galeria de la Raza, SOMArts, Mission Cultural Center for Latino Arts, among others.

Yañez was a member of the food-based art group The Great Tortilla Conspiracy making tortilla art, other members include Joseph "Jos" Sances, René Yañez, and Art Hazelwood.

In 2014, Rio Yañez moved to the Fruitvale neighborhood of Oakland. After his father passed away in 2018, Rio took up the role as co-curator of the annual Día de los Muertos in the Mission District.

References 

1980 births
Artists from San Francisco
American artists of Mexican descent
Artists from the San Francisco Bay Area
Mexican-American culture in California
California Institute of the Arts alumni
Living people
Hispanic and Latino American artists